Mali competed at the 1992 Summer Olympics in Barcelona, Spain.

Competitors
The following is the list of number of competitors in the Games.

Results by event

Athletics
Men's 100m metres
Ousmane Diarra
 Heat — 10.87 (→ did not advance)

Women's 400m metres
Fanta Dao
 Heat — 1:01.97 (→ did not advance)

References

Sources
Official Olympic Reports

Nations at the 1992 Summer Olympics
1992
Oly